

Fossils
 William Clark notices an exposed fossil rib in an area later known as the Hell Creek Formation on the south bank of the Yellowstone River. Although he mistakenly believed the rib belonged to a huge fish, paleontologists have determined that this event marks the first documented dinosaur fossil discovery in North America.

References

1800s in paleontology
Paleontology